George Turner (22 February 1858 – 2 July 1927) was a New Zealand cricketer. He played in two first-class matches for Canterbury from 1878 to 1880.

See also
 List of Canterbury representative cricketers

References

External links
 

1858 births
1927 deaths
New Zealand cricketers
Canterbury cricketers
Cricketers from Christchurch